Juan Givanel (1868–1946) was a Spanish philologist, erudite, literary critic and Cervantes scholar.

Spanish literary critics
1868 births
1946 deaths